George Wild (born 1887) was an English professional footballer who played as an inside right.

Career
Wild spent his early career with Sowerby Bridge Institute and Halifax Town. He signed for Bradford City from Halifax Town in December 1913. He made 2 league appearances for the club, before being released in 1914.

Sources

References

1887 births
Date of death missing
English footballers
Halifax Town A.F.C. players
Bradford City A.F.C. players
English Football League players
Association football inside forwards